Karoline Graswander-Hainz (born 2 February 1974) is an Austrian politician who served as Member of the European Parliament (MEP) from 2015 until 2019. She is a member of the Social Democratic Party, part of the Party of European Socialists.

Parliamentary service
Vice-Chair, Delegation to the Euro-Latin American Parliamentary Assembly (2015-)
Member, Committee on International Trade
Member, Delegation for relations with Brazil
Member, Delegation for relations with Mercosur

External links

References

Living people
1974 births
21st-century women MEPs for Austria
MEPs for Austria 2014–2019
Social Democratic Party of Austria MEPs
People from Landeck District